Elena Kuznetsova (born 1 August 1982) is an Uzbekistani sport shooter. Kuznetsova represented Uzbekistan at the 2008 Summer Olympics in Beijing, where she competed for two rifle shooting events. She placed thirty-second out of forty-seven shooters in the women's 10 m air rifle, with a total score of 392 points. Nearly a week later, Kuznetsova competed for her second event, 50 m rifle 3 positions, where she was able to shoot 192 targets in a prone position, 191 in standing, and 190 in kneeling, for a total score of 573 points, finishing only in thirtieth place.

References

External links
NBC Olympics Profile

Uzbekistani female sport shooters
Living people
Olympic shooters of Uzbekistan
Shooters at the 2008 Summer Olympics
1982 births
Shooters at the 2006 Asian Games
Shooters at the 2010 Asian Games
Asian Games medalists in shooting
Asian Games bronze medalists for Uzbekistan
Medalists at the 2010 Asian Games
Shooters at the 2018 Asian Games
21st-century Uzbekistani women